Goodbye Dear Moon is a 2004 Argentine sci-fi comedy film directed by Fernando Spiner and written by Spiner, Sergio Bizzio, Valentín Javier Diment, Alejandra Flechner, Alejandro Urdapilleta, and Sergio Bizzio.

Cast 
 Alejandro Urdapilleta as Subcommander Esteban Ulloa
 Alejandra Flechner as Subcommander Silvia C. Rodulfo
 Gabriel Goity as Commander Humberto A. Delgado 
 Horacio Fontova as García, the extraterrestrial
 Luis Ziembrowsky as the voice of Loiacono
 Rita Morchio as the voice of the "Estanislao" space ship
 Claudio Rissi as the voice of the prologue narrator
 Adela Larreta as Norma
 Manu Soler as an holographic simulation of Diego Maradona

Awards
Wins
 Mar del Plata Film Festival: Best Actor, Alejandro Urdapilleta; 2004.

Nominations
 Argentine Film Critics Association Awards: Silver Condor; Best Costume Design, Ricky Casali and Paola Delgado; 2006.

References

External links
 
 Adiós Querida Luna at the cinenacional.com 

2004 films
Argentine black-and-white films
2000s science fiction comedy films
Argentine independent films
2000s Spanish-language films
Argentine science fiction comedy films
2004 comedy films
2004 independent films
2000s Argentine films